Mrčevac (Montenegrin and Serbian: Мрчевац) is a village in the municipality of Tivat, Montenegro.

Demographics
According to the 2011 census, it had a population of 2,110 people.

See also
Tivat-Mrčevac Airport

References

Populated places in Tivat Municipality